Beer and Loathing is the tenth studio album by Canadian celtic punk band The Real McKenzies. It was released on July 3, 2020 under Fat Wreck Chords in the United States and Stomp Records in Canada.

Single
The first single to be released, which is named after the album, was released on July 2, 2020. The second "Big Foot Steps" was released on May 31, 2020.

Background
At the time of writing music for the album, the band were on a world tour, which ended up being postponed due to the COVID-19 pandemic.

Track listing

References

2020 albums
The Real McKenzies albums
Fat Wreck Chords albums